Krasimir Khristov (born February 25, 1953) is a Bulgarian sprint canoer who competed in the mid-1970s. At the 1976 Summer Olympics in Montreal, he finished sixth in the C-2 500 m event and finished seventh in the C-2 1000 m event.

References

1953 births
Bulgarian male canoeists
Canoeists at the 1976 Summer Olympics
Living people
Olympic canoeists of Bulgaria